Austrolimnophila is a genus of crane fly in the family Limoniidae.

Species
Subgenus Archilimnophila Alexander, 1934
A. arborea Savchenko, 1978
A. harperi Alexander, 1926
A. subpolaris Savchenko, 1969
A. subunica Alexander, 1920
A. subunicoides Alexander, 1950
A. unica Osten Sacken, 1869
Subgenus Austrolimnophila Alexander, 1920

A. acanthophallus Alexander, 1955
A. accola Alexander, 1961
A. acutergata Alexander, 1939
A. agathicola Alexander, 1952
A. agma Alexander, 1972
A. aka Theischinger, 2000
A. amatrix Alexander, 1960
A. analis Santos Abreu, 1923
A. anjouanensis Alexander, 1979
A. antiqua Skuse, 1890
A. argus Hutton, 1900
A. asiatica Alexander, 1925
A. aspidophora Alexander, 1955
A. atripes Alexander, 1922
A. autumnalis Alexander, 1929
A. badia Doane, 1900
A. bifidaria Alexander, 1942
A. birungana Alexander, 1924
A. bradleyi Alexander, 1929
A. brevicellula Stary, 1977
A. bulbulifera Alexander, 1948
A. buxtoni Alexander, 1956
A. byersiana Alexander, 1968
A. candiditarsis Alexander, 1937
A. canuta Alexander, 1958
A. caparaoensis Alexander, 1944
A. chiloeana Alexander, 1953
A. chrysorrhoea Edwards, 1923
A. claduroneura Speiser, 1909
A. claduroneurodes Alexander, 1956
A. collessiana Theischinger, 1996
A. comantis Alexander, 1948
A. crassipes Hutton, 1900
A. croceipennis Alexander, 1962
A. cyatheti Edwards, 1923
A. cyclopica Alexander, 1947
A. danbulla Theischinger, 1996
A. deltoides Alexander, 1960
A. diacanthophora Alexander, 1962
A. diffusa Alexander, 1920
A. discoboloides Alexander, 1947
A. dislocata Alexander, 1961
A. distigma Alexander, 1920
A. duseni Alexander, 1920
A. echidna Alexander, 1956
A. elnora Alexander, 1929
A. ephippigera Alexander, 1946
A. erecta Alexander, 1934
A. eucharis Alexander, 1962
A. eutaeniata Bigot, 1888
A. excelsior Alexander, 1960
A. exsanguis Alexander, 1955
A. fluxa Alexander, 1936
A. fulvipennis Alexander, 1921
A. fuscohalterata Alexander, 1929
A. geographica Hutton, 1900
A. griseiceps Alexander, 1921
A. hausa Alexander, 1974
A. hazelae Alexander, 1929
A. hoogstraali Alexander, 1972
A. horii Alexander, 1925
A. illustris Alexander, 1923
A. infidelis Alexander, 1929
A. interjecta Alexander, 1936
A. interventa Skuse, 1890
A. iris Alexander, 1929
A. irwinsmithae Alexander, 1937
A. japenensis Alexander, 1947
A. joana Alexander, 1929
A. jobiensis Alexander, 1947
A. kirishimensis Alexander, 1925
A. laetabunda Alexander, 1960
A. lambi Edwards, 1923
A. latistyla Stary, 1977
A. leleupi Alexander, 1962
A. leucomelas Edwards, 1923
A. lewisiana Theischinger, 1996
A. linae Alexander, 1947
A. lobophora Alexander, 1960
A. luteipleura Alexander, 1949
A. macrophallus Alexander, 1958
A. macropyga Alexander, 1953
A. mannheimsi Alexander, 1960
A. marcida Alexander, 1924
A. marshalli Hutton, 1900
A. martinezi Alexander, 1957
A. medialis Alexander, 1921
A. megapophysis Alexander, 1979
A. merklei Alexander, 1928
A. michaelseni Alexander, 1929
A. microspilota Alexander, 1943
A. microsticta Alexander, 1929
A. minor Alexander, 1962
A. mobilis Alexander, 1934
A. multiscripta Alexander, 1960
A. multitergata Alexander, 1962
A. munifica Alexander, 1928
A. nahuelicola Alexander, 1957
A. natalensis Alexander, 1921
A. nebrias Alexander, 1962
A. neuquenensis Alexander, 1952
A. nigrocincta Edwards, 1923
A. nokonis Alexander, 1928
A. norrisiana Theischinger, 1996
A. nympha Alexander, 1943
A. obliquata Alexander, 1922
A. ochracea Meigen, 1804
A. oculata Edwards, 1923
A. oroensis Alexander, 1943
A. orthia Alexander, 1924
A. pacifera Alexander, 1937
A. pallidistyla Alexander, 1942
A. percara Alexander, 1957
A. percincta Alexander, 1955
A. peremarginata Alexander, 1955
A. persessilis Alexander, 1939
A. petasma Alexander, 1961
A. phantasma Alexander, 1956
A. platensis Alexander, 1923
A. platyterga Alexander, 1958
A. pleurolineata Alexander, 1957
A. pleurostria Alexander, 1958
A. plumbeipleura Alexander, 1949
A. polydamas Alexander, 1960
A. polyspilota Alexander, 1937
A. praepostera Alexander, 1956
A. pristina Alexander, 1924
A. proximata Alexander, 1926
A. punctipennis Philippi, 1866
A. recens Alexander, 1921
A. relicta Alexander, 1928
A. robinsoni Alexander, 1958
A. saturnina Alexander, 1961
A. septifera Alexander, 1968
A. spectabilis Alexander, 1921
A. spinicaudata Alexander, 1937
A. stemma Alexander, 1922
A. stenoptera Alexander, 1981
A. sternolobata Alexander, 1957
A. strigimacula Edwards, 1923
A. striopleura Alexander, 1960
A. styx Alexander, 1965
A. subinterventa Edwards, 1923
A. subpacifera Alexander, 1942
A. subsessilis Alexander, 1970
A. superstes Alexander, 1960
A. tanana Alexander, 1972
A. tenuilobata Alexander, 1942
A. tergifera Alexander, 1953
A. tergofurcata Alexander, 1965
A. terpsis Alexander, 1960
A. thornei Wood, 1952
A. toxoneura Osten Sacken, 1860
A. transvaalica Alexander, 1917
A. tremula Alexander, 1929
A. trifidula Alexander, 1960
A. tsaratananae Alexander, 1955
A. tunguraguensis Alexander, 1940
A. varitarsis Alexander, 1929
A. vivasberthieri Alexander, 1938
A. volentis Alexander, 1951
A. wilfredlongi Alexander, 1952
A. wilhelminae Alexander, 1960
A. wygodzinskyi Alexander, 1948
A. xanthoptera Alexander, 1929
A. yoruba Alexander, 1974
A. yumotana Alexander, 1934

Subgenus Limnophilaspis Alexander, 1950
A. brevisetosa Alexander, 1950
A. ecalcarata Edwards, 1933
Subgenus Mediophragma Alexander, 1954
A. delectissima Alexander, 1954
A. paraguayana Alexander, 1952
Subgenus Phragmocrypta Alexander, 1956
A. albocoxalis Alexander, 1934
A. fulani Alexander, 1974
A. gyldenstolpei Alexander, 1924
A. maumau Alexander, 1956
A. recessiva Alexander, 1956

References

Limoniidae
Nematocera genera